The name Saola has been used to name three tropical cyclones in the northwestern Pacific Ocean. The name was contributed by Vietnam and refers to the saola, a rarely observed bovine species first found in Vietnam.
 Typhoon Saola (2005) (T0517, 18W)
 Typhoon Saola (2012) (T1209, 10W, Gener)
 Severe Tropical Storm Saola (2017) (T1722, 27W, Quedan)

Pacific typhoon set index articles